"Put It on Me" is a song by American rapper YoungBoy Never Broke Again from his mixtape Realer 2 (2022). It was produced by Cheese, Leor Shevah and 301.Arjun. The song went viral on TikTok.

Composition
The song finds YoungBoy rhyming about street life and his relationship, in his signature flow.

Music video
An accompanying music video was directed by Isaac Garcia. In it, YoungBoy is seen rapping in front of a white background, in the woods, and on top of a building. His girlfriend Jazlyn Mychelle makes a cameo and is shown to be pregnant.

Charts

References

2022 songs
YoungBoy Never Broke Again songs
Songs written by YoungBoy Never Broke Again